Made in Denmark is a Danish lifestyle and reality television program, in which a number of professionals in arts and crafts display their skills in their own area, and experiment with the other participant's materials. It debuted in 2015 on Danmarks Radio. The program was hosted by Ane Cortzen.

Series overview

Season One (2015)
The first season of Made in Denmark featured 7 craftsmen, one of which would be the mentor in each episode. The mentor would teach the other 6 how to use their material, and in the end a famous personality within that field would judge the creations that the participants had made. The final episode was a finale in which all 7 craftsmen participated and a judge would declare the final winner.

Participants

Episodes

Christmas special: Made in Denmark Jul
Made in Denmark Jul is the Christmas special for the series. It featured the 7 craftsmen from the first season, making Christmas decorations. The judge for the special was Jette Frölich. The special consisted of three episodes.

Episodes

Season Two (2016)
The second season featured 7 new craftsmen, but followed the format of the first season. The final episode was a finale in which all 7 craftsmen participated and a judge would declare the final winner.

Participants

Episodes

References

Danish reality television series
2015 Danish television series debuts
Danish-language television shows